Ercole Gonzaga (23 November 1505 – 2 March 1563) was an Italian Cardinal.

Biography
Born in Mantua, he was the son of the Marquis Francesco Gonzaga and Isabella d'Este, and nephew of Cardinal Sigismondo Gonzaga. He studied philosophy at Bologna under Pietro Pomponazzi, and later took up theology.

In 1520, or as some say, 1525, Sigismondo renounced in his favour the See of Mantua; in 1527 his mother Isabella brought him back from Rome the insignia of the cardinalate. He was chosen to be a cardinal at the very young age of 20, this quick ascention to power being the fruit of the diplomatic mastery of Isabella Gonzaga.

Notwithstanding his youth, he showed great zeal for church reform, especially in his own diocese; and in this he received help and encouragement from his friend Cardinal Giberti, Bishop of Verona. His mode of life was stainless and a manuscript work of his, Vitae Christianae institutio, bears witness to his piety. He published a Latin catechism for the use of the priests of his diocese and built the diocesan seminary, thus carrying out reforms urged by the Council of Trent, as his friends Contarini, Gilberti, Caraffa, and other bishops had done or were doing, even before the council had assembled.

His charity was unbounded, and many young men of talent and genius had their university expenses paid by him. The popes employed him on many embassies, e.g. to the Emperor Charles V in 1530. Because of his prudence and his business-like methods, he was a favourite with the popes, with Charles V, and Ferdinand I of Spain, and with Francis I of France and Henry II of France.

From 1540 to 1556 he was guardian to the young sons of his brother Federico II Gonzaga who had died, and in their name he governed the Duchy of Mantua. The elder of the boys, Francesco, died in 1550 and was succeeded by his brother Guglielmo.

In the Papal conclave, 1559 it was thought he would certainly be made pope; but the cardinals would not choose as pope a scion of a ruling house. In 1561 Pope Pius IV named him papal legate to the Council of Trent, for which he had from the beginning laboured by every means at his command, moral and material. In its early stages, because not a few considered he was in favour of Communion under both kinds, he met with many difficulties, and interested motives were attributed to him.  He contracted fever at Trento, where he died, attended by Diego Laynez.

References

1505 births
1563 deaths
Ercole
16th-century Italian cardinals
Bishops of Mantua
Regents of Mantua
16th-century Italian Roman Catholic bishops
Participants in the Council of Trent
16th-century Italian nobility